Takanohana Kenshi 貴ノ花 健士 (born Hanada Mitsuru; February 19, 1950 – May 30, 2005) was a sumo wrestler from Hirosaki, Aomori, Japan. His highest rank was ōzeki, which he held for fifty tournaments. As an active rikishi he was extremely popular and was nicknamed the "Prince of Sumo" due to his good looks and relatively slim build. He was the father of Wakanohana Masaru and Takanohana Kōji, and as head of the Futagoyama stable coached both of them to the yokozuna rank.

Career
He had been a champion swimmer while at school, but did not think he could make a living out of it. He was determined to join professional sumo, in spite of some opposition from his family,  who had wanted him to continue swimming (he was considered a possibility to make the team for the 1968 Summer Olympics in Mexico City).

He began his career in the spring of 1965, joining Futagoyama stable which had been set up his elder brother, former yokozuna Wakanohana Kanji I, three years previously. He initially fought under his own surname of Hanada. He reached the top makuuchi division in November 1968 at the age of just 18, the youngest ever at the time (the record is now held by his son Takanohana). He weighed barely 100 kg, and would remain one of the lightest men in the top division for the rest of his career. He adopted the shikona of Takanohana in 1969. He was the last man to beat yokozuna Taihō, in May 1971. As he rose up the rankings he collected nine special prizes, including four prestigious ginō-shō, or Technique Awards.

After finishing as runner-up in consecutive tournaments in May and July 1972 he reached sumo's second highest rank of ōzeki in November 1972. He was promoted at the same time as his friend and rival Wajima,  who quickly went on to be promoted to yokozuna. Takanohana's progress was slower, but he did win two top division tournament (or honbasho) championships in March and September 1975, each time delighting the crowds by defeating the giant yokozuna Kitanoumi in a playoff. He and Wakanohana were the first brothers ever to each win a top division tournament title. He was also runner-up in the January and March 1977 tournaments. However he was ultimately unable to defeat Kitanoumi or Wajima on a regular basis, and was hampered by his inability to put on weight, and so never made the yokozuna rank. Nevertheless, he was an  ōzeki for fifty tournaments, corresponding to over eight years in the rank. This was a record until July 2007 when it was broken by Chiyotaikai. He was a bigger crowd attraction than some yokozuna.

By the early 1980s he was finding it harder to hold onto his rank, and had been overtaken by his stablemate Wakanohana Kanji II, and other younger wrestlers. One of his final bouts was a memorable clash in September 1980 with Hawaiian born Takamiyama, who was nearly twice his weight and like Takanohana, extremely popular with the Japanese public. Takanohana looked to have won the match with an underarm throw, only for the judges to reverse the referee's decision and rule that the tip of Takanohana's topknot or ōichōmage had brushed the surface of the dohyō ahead of his opponent.

After losing to the rising star Chiyonofuji twice in a row in September and November 1980, he decided the time was right to retire. The two were often compared, and Takanohana had been something of a mentor to Chiyonofuji, advising him to give up smoking to help increase his weight, something that Takanohana himself had never been able to manage.

After retirement
After retiring from sumo in January 1981, he took the name Fujishima and established the Fujishima stable in 1982, which grew to be one of the most powerful in terms of top makuuchi ranked wrestlers.  When his elder brother retired as a stablemaster in 1993 he purchased the Futagoyama toshiyori-kabu or elder stock, with the help of 300 million yen from his koenkai, or network of supporters. The two stables merged, and the newly renamed Futagoyama stable  had one quarter of all the top ranked rikishi in it at one point, including two yokozuna, an ōzeki and many others regularly in the junior san'yaku ranks.  During this time it was undoubtedly the most powerful stable the sumo world has seen in the postwar period. He oversaw the promotion of both of his sons to yokozuna, the first time ever that two siblings have held sumo's highest rank.

He was married in 1970 to a former actress and beauty queen, Fujita Noriko, who was once "Miss Ōita Prefecture". They were divorced in 2001.

His health began to decline in 2003, and he withdrew from his duties in the Sumo Association. He passed on control of Futagoyama stable to his son Takanohana in January 2004, and made his last public appearance in January 2005 at the retirement ceremony of one of his former wrestlers, Takanonami.

Death

In February 2005, his son publicly announced that his father was struggling with mouth cancer (he had been a heavy smoker of Mild Seven cigarettes for most of his life). He underwent extensive treatment, but no recovery was possible, and on 30 May 2005, he succumbed to the disease at the age of 55. There was an acrimonious battle between Takanohana's sons over who should be head mourner at his funeral. More than 1200 attended the event, which was held in Aoyama, Minato, Tokyo. The Sumo Association also held a public funeral in the Ryōgoku Kokugikan on June 13. This was the first time in nine years that a former wrestler had been afforded this honour.

Fighting style
Takanohana's favoured techniques were hidari-yotsu (a right hand outside, left hand inside grip on his opponent's mawashi), tsuridashi (lift out) and uwatenage (overarm throw). He was also noted for his ability to spin at the edge of the ring and turn the tables on his opponent with the utchari throw.

Career record

See also
Glossary of sumo terms
List of past sumo wrestlers
List of sumo tournament top division champions
List of sumo tournament second division champions
List of ōzeki

References

External links
 Article on brothers in sumo

1950 births
2005 deaths
Deaths from cancer in Japan
Deaths from oral cancer
Hanada family
Japanese sumo wrestlers
Ōzeki
People from Hirosaki
Sumo people from Aomori Prefecture